Richard Vernon Umphrey III (born December 13, 1958) is a former American football offensive lineman. He played professionally in the National Football League for the New York Giants (1982–1984) and the San Diego Chargers (1985). He graduated from Tustin High School in Tustin, California and went on to play at the University of Colorado at Boulder.  He was drafted in the fifth round of the 1982 NFL Draft by the New York Giants as the starting center.  He played three seasons for the Giants before being traded in 1985 to the San Diego Chargers.

He is married to Jackie and father to Justin and Noel Umphrey, a water polo player for UCLA.

1958 births
Living people
People from Garden Grove, California
Players of American football from California
American football centers
Colorado Buffaloes football players
New York Giants players
San Diego Chargers players
Sportspeople from Orange County, California